The Weld Ministry was the seventh responsible government to be formed in New Zealand, and lasted a less than a year during the New Zealand Wars. It formed in November 1864 and lasted until October 1865. As the office of premier had yet to be formally established, Frederick Weld was never gazetted premier but did resign the position at the end of his tenure.

Background
In September 1864, the Fox–Whitaker government collapsed amid Governor Grey's rejection of their hard-line land confiscation policy towards Māori, and the British Parliament's rejection of the full sum of their proposed £3 million loan. The British also desired to remove the last of the Imperial regiments unless the New Zealand Government paid them £40 annually per soldier. This raised the opposition of South Island interests, who had a much lower Māori population and resented having to pay for wars in the North Island.

In October, therefore, Frederick Weld announced an alternative policy of "self-reliance", accepting the removal of the regiments and the management of defence policy by the colonial government. He took office on the first day of the new session of the General Assembly. However, the policy was never fully implemented as fresh outbreaks of violence in Taranaki and the East Cape delayed the departure of General Cameron. Cameron followed his own strategy, while Governor Grey gave orders to the colonial militia without ministerial advice. Land confiscations and road-making through Māori districts continued under the Weld ministry, while the financial situation forced them to increase customs duties and accept a higher rate of interest on an overseas loan.

During this ministry, the capital was moved to Wellington and a steamer service to Panama was established. However, the Government’s financial position became more precarious than ever. A provincialist motion of no confidence (to give half the revenue of the new stamp duty to the provincial governments) was moved by Julius Vogel and only defeated on the Speaker's casting vote. Weld resigned anyway, and Edward Stafford was recalled to lead a new ministry.

Ministers
The following members served in the Weld Ministry:

See also
 New Zealand Government

Notes

References

Ministries of Queen Victoria
Governments of New Zealand
19th century in New Zealand
1864 establishments in New Zealand
Cabinets disestablished in 1865